Fulton–Montgomery Community College (FMCC) is a public community college in Johnstown, New York. It is part of the State University of New York and serves Fulton and Montgomery counties. The college offers 45 degree and certificate programs, 30 campus clubs, and is a member of the NJCAA, offering Division III sports in basketball, soccer, baseball, softball and volleyball. In 2013, new dorms were added to the campus to serve local and out-of-town students.
Its many notable alumni include Carolyn Muessig, a medievalist specializing in sermon literature, female education, and hagiography, now the Chair of Christian Thought in the Department of Classics and Religion, University of Calgary.

References

Two-year colleges in the United States
SUNY community colleges
Education in Fulton County, New York
NJCAA athletics
Educational institutions established in 1963
1963 establishments in New York (state)